Smile is the third studio album by Belgian trio Lasgo. It features the singles "Out of My Mind", "Gone", "Lost" and "Over You". The album is Jelle Van Dael's first contribution as the vocalist for Lasgo, after singer Evi Goffin was replaced. All songs written and produced by Jef Martens and Peter Luts.

Track listing

Charts

References

External links 

2009 albums
Lasgo albums